RAF El Amiriya is a former Royal Air Force military airfield in Egypt, located approximately  16 km south-southwest of Alexandria;  180 km northwest of Cairo

El Amiriya was a pre–World War II airfield, first used in 1917.  During World War II, the station was also referred to as Landing Grounds 85 - 99, 154 and 171–175.  During World War II, it was used as a military airfield by the Royal Air Force and the United States Army Air Forces during the North African Campaign against Axis forces.

USAAF Ninth Air Force units which used the airfield were:

 79th Fighter Group, 19 November 1942 – 14 January 1943, P-40 Warhawk
 324th Fighter Group, December 1942 - 2 February 1943, P-40 Warhawk

After the war, the airfield appears to have been closed about 1946. Today, the area is abandoned with various concrete parts of the station still in evidence when viewed by aerial photography.

References

Notes

Bibliography

British Coordinates
 LG-85 
 LG-99 
 LG-154 
 LG-171 
 LG-175

See also
 List of World War II North Africa Airfields

References

 Maurer, Maurer. Air Force Combat Units of World War II. Maxwell AFB, Alabama: Office of Air Force History, 1983. .
 
 Royal Air Force Airfield Creation for the Western Desert Campaign

External links

Royal Air Force stations in Egypt
Royal Air Force stations of World War II in Egypt
Airfields of the United States Army Air Forces in Egypt
World War II airfields in Egypt
Defunct airports in Egypt
Airports established in 1917